Acacia barakulensis, commonly known as waajie wattle, is a shrub belonging to the genus Acacia and the subgenus Juliflorae that is native to north eastern Australia.

Description
Like most species of Acacia, it has phyllodes rather than true leaves. It blooms between August and September producing yellow coloured flowers. The simple inflorescences simple that occur singly in the nodes with spherical flower-heads with a diameter of around  containing 20 to 35 flowers. After flowering chartaceous, brown seed pods form with a linear shape form.

Taxonomy
The shrub belongs to the Acacia johnsonii group and is most closely related to Acacia burbidgeae.

Distribution
It is endemic to a small area to the north of Chinchilla within the Barakula State Forest, where it grows in sandy or pale loamy-sandy soils over sandstone as a part of Eucalyptus woodland communities. It is found in a similar habitat as Acacia gittinsii consisting of tall shrubland or shrubby woodland with other species of Acacia as well as Eucalyptus tenuipes, Corymbia trachyphloia and Triodia mitchellii.

See also
 List of Acacia species

References

barakulensis
Flora of Queensland
Taxa named by Leslie Pedley
Plants described in 1999